Sankt Johann Airport is a public use airport located  east of Sankt Johann in Tirol, Tyrol, Austria.

See also
List of airports in Austria

References

External links 
 Airport record for Sankt Johann Airport at Landings.com

Airports in Austria
Buildings and structures in Tyrol (state)
Transport in Tyrol (state)